This is a list of mayors of Whitehorse, the capital of the Canadian territory of Yukon. Whitehorse has had an elected mayor and council since its incorporation as a city in 1950; prior to that, Whitehorse existed as an unincorporated settlement with no local municipal government.

The mayor presides over Whitehorse City Council.

List of mayors of Whitehorse

Notes 
Governance of the city was temporarily transferred to a taxpayer advisory committee led by Joseph Oliver for part of 1973, after five of the city's six councillors resigned on July 9, 1973 in protest against a jurisdictional dispute with the Yukon Territorial Council, leaving the council without a quorum to conduct city business; Wybrew was also dismissed as mayor during this committee governance period. Following a by-election on September 20, 1973, Wybrew returned to office and served until December.

Election results

2021

2018

2015

References

External links
Yukon Statistics: Whitehorse Mayors & Councillors - Hougen Group of Companies

Whitehorse
Lists of people from Yukon
Mayors of Whitehorse